Xermade, is a municipality in the Spanish province of Lugo.

Parròquies
Burgás (Santa Baia)
Cabreiros (Santa Mariña)
Candamil (San Miguel)
Cazás (San Xulián)
Lousada (Santo André)
Miraz (San Pedro)
Momán (San Mamede)
Piñeiro (San Martiño)
Roupar (San Pedro Fiz)
Xermade (Santa María)

Municipalities in the Province of Lugo